PFLAG China (同性恋亲友会 in Chinese), founded in Guangzhou on June 28, 2008, is an NGO formed by LGBT individuals, their parents, friends and supporters to serve and support LGBT people. PFLAG China is an independent organization, named after the American organization called PFLAG.

History

 June 28, 2008
 Founded in Guangzhou, China;
 January 2009
 Held 1st National LGBT Conference in Guangzhou, China
 December 2009
 Held 2nd National LGBT Conference in Guangzhou, China
 August 2010
 Held 3rd National LGBT Conference in Beijing, China
 August, 2011
 Launched Guangzhou office
 October 2011
 Held 4th National LGBT Conference in Guangzhou
 November 2011
 Held Regional LGBT Conference in Wuhan, Hubei Province
 February 2012 
 Launched first 400 Hotline for LGBT people
 April 2012
 Held Regional LGBT Conference in Hangzhou, Zhejiang Province
 June 2012
 Held Regional LGBT Conference in Shenyang, Liaoning Province
 September 2012
 Held 5th National LGBT Conference in Chengdu, China

National LGBT Conference 
PFLAG China holds a National LGBT Conference annually in different cities of China from 2009. The Conference provides a chance for LGBT people, their parents and friends to communicate together, help LGBT individuals to be accepted by parents and friends and improve their self-identity. The Conference also attracts more LGBT people, parents and friends to participate in LGBT Rights movement, and creates more healthy and dignified social environment.

400 Hotline 
PFLAG China launched the first 400 hotline for LGBT people and their parents. It is answered by parents of gays and lesbians as well as psychiatrists in order to provide correct information and support to help them with their difficulties.

See also
 China Rainbow Media Awards
 LGBT rights in the People's Republic of China

References 

copyright license http://www.pflag.org.cn/News_View.asp?NewsID=103

LGBT rights in China
Organizations based in Guangzhou